is a form of Morse code used to send Japanese language in kana characters. Unlike International Morse Code, which represents letters of the Latin script, in Wabun each symbol represents a Japanese kana. For this reason, Wabun code is also sometimes called Kana code.

When Wabun code is intermixed with International Morse code, the prosign DO is used to announce the beginning of Wabun, and the prosign SN is used to announce the return to International Code.

Chart 
Kana in Iroha order.

Expanded chart

References

External links 
CW Wabun
Japanese Code Wabun Morse
The Silent War Against the Japanese Navy
The Codebreakers: The Comprehensive History of Secret Communication from Ancient Times to the Internet
Code Breaking in the Pacific
Katakana Man, The Most Secret of all Allied Operations in World War II in the Pacific

Encodings of Japanese
Morse code

ja:モールス符号#和文モールス符号